Baby Gold is an American retailer and producer of jewelry based in Los Angeles. Since its launch in 2018, the company has been featured in several notable press outlets and has been involved in various philanthropic ventures.

Background 
Baby Gold was launched in 2018 by Helen Ashikian and her husband Michael Ashikian. Helen comes from an ancestral family of artisans and jewelers and ran production for other fine jewelry lines after graduating from University of Southern California. In 2010, she married her husband Michael, who is a third-generation jeweler himself and owns a manufacturing facility in Downtown Los Angeles. Most of Baby Gold's products are produced from this manufacturing facility. The company's products consists of jewelry made from 14K gold. Being a member of the Responsible Jewellery Council, the company produces its products in an ethical and environmentally sustainable manner. Since the manufacturing facility is run by the company itself, clients are also able to customize their jewelry orders to suit their needs.

In the press 

Baby Gold has been featured by major media outlets for style pieces and gift guides. They were featured in style roundups as seen in: The Zoe Report, Harper's Bazaar, Forbes, Who What Wear, and others. Baby Gold has also been seen in many gift guides in outlets such as: Real Simple, Vogue, Glamour, Popsugar, and Esquire. Baby Gold has been a favorite among several celebrities including Kaia Gerber, Kim Kardashian, Shay Mitchell, Behati Prinsloo, Meghan Trainor, Ashley Graham, and others.

Philanthropy 
Baby Gold has been involved in several philanthropic efforts including a campaign aimed at ending child hunger in America. In October 2020, Baby Gold also started a campaign to help raise funds for the Armenia Fund.

External links
 Baby Gold (official website)

References

Companies based in Los Angeles
Jewelry companies of the United States
Retail companies established in 2018
American companies established in 2018
American jewelry designers
2018 establishments in the United States
21st-century American jewellers